Speinshart is a municipality  in the district of Neustadt an der Waldnaab in Bavaria, Germany. The municipality gained its name from the monastery Speinshart which was built between 1692 and 1697 by Wolfgang Dientzenhofer.

Mayor
Albert Nickl (* 1963) (CSU) is the mayor since 1996.

References

Neustadt an der Waldnaab (district)